Zeal Chigozie Atuanya (born on 13 September 1980, Aba, Abia State) is a Nigerian actor, producer and entrepreneur.

Early life and education
Chigozie Atuanya was born in Aba, Abia State but hails from Agu-Ukwu Nri in Anambra State. He holds a B.Sc. in Public Administration from Enugu State University of Science and Technology.

Career
He made his screen debut in a 1998 film titled King Jaja of Opobo and has since gone on to produce and star in several films. He was once a model for Delta Soap, appearing in one of their television commercials.

Selected filmography

Rattle Snake 3
Evil Forest
Ladies Men
Ladies Gang
Heavy Thunder
Touch and Follow
Sweet Potato
Double Slap
Royal Palace
Chetanna
Brother's Keeper

Awards and nominations

See also
 List of Nigerian actors

References

External links

Living people
Enugu State University of Science and Technology alumni
20th-century Nigerian male actors
21st-century Nigerian male actors
Igbo male actors
Nigerian male television actors
Nigerian male film actors
Nigerian film producers
Nigerian film directors
Actors from Anambra State
Nigerian businesspeople
1980 births